Austropaschia is a monotypic snout moth genus. It was described by George Hampson in 1916, and contains the species Austropaschia porrigens. It is found in Australia.

References

Epipaschiinae
Monotypic moth genera
Moths of Australia
Pyralidae genera